Baard is a village in the Dutch province of Friesland. It is located in the municipality Leeuwarden, about 10 km southwest of the city of Leeuwarden. Baard had a population of about 189 in January 2017.

History
The village was first mentioned in 1329 as Bawerth, and means terp (artificial living mound) of Bavo (person). The first church was built around 1250. The current church dates from 1876. In 1840, it was home to 244 people.

Before 2018, the village was part of the Littenseradiel municipality and before 1984 it belonged to Baarderadeel municipality.

Gallery

References

External links

Leeuwarden
Populated places in Friesland